Raimonda Murmokaitė (born 17 July 1959) is a Lithuanian diplomat, serving as Permanent Representative of Lithuania to the United Nations since 25 October 2012, when she presented her credentials to UN Secretary-General Ban Ki-moon. She served as President of the United Nations Security Council for February 2014 and May 2015 and leave her post as Permanent Representative in New York in 2017.

References

External links

1959 births
Living people
Permanent Representatives of Lithuania to the United Nations
Lithuanian women diplomats
Place of birth missing (living people)
Lithuanian women ambassadors